The 2016 Philadelphia Freedoms season was the 16th season of the franchise (in its current incarnation) in World TeamTennis (WTT).

The Freedoms finished fourth in WTT, narrowly losing a standings tiebreaker for third place, with a record of 7 wins and 5 losses and missed the postseason for the first time since 2013. The Freedoms were led by WTT Male Rookie of the Year Fabrice Martin.

Season recap

Draft
At the WTT Draft on March 25, 2016, the Freedoms selected Caroline Wozniacki with the first pick in the marquee player portion of the draft. They passed on making a second-round marquee selection. In the roster portion of the draft, the Freedoms did not protect any players from their 2015 squad including 2014 WTT Male Most Valuable Player Marcelo Melo. They selected Lukáš Lacko, Daria Kasatkina, Fabrice Martin and Naomi Broady as roster players in the first four rounds. In addition to Melo, the Freedoms left Taylor Townsend, Robby Ginepri, Liezel Huber, Asia Muhammad, Abigail Spears and Coco Vandeweghe unprotected. In the fifth round, the Freedoms selected roster-exempt player Donald Young.

Crawford replaces Kasatkina
On July 6, 2016, the Freedoms announced they had signed Samantha Crawford to replace Daria Kasatkina, who had been selected to represent Russia at the 2016 Summer Olympics.

A solid start
The Freedoms opened their season on July 31, 2016, with a 23–17 road win against the Springfield Lasers. Lukáš Lacko and Fabrice Martin won the opening set of men's doubles, 5–3. After the Lasers won the second and third sets in tiebreakers to tie the match at 13 all, Naomi Broady and Samantha Crawford dominated all three of their service games, never facing a break point, while converting two breaks against Michaëlla Krajicek and Pauline Parmentier for a 5–1 women's doubles set win that gave the Freedoms an 18–14 lead. Broady and Martin closed out the victory by taking the mixed doubles set, 5–3.

The following evening, the Freedoms were in New York City for a match with the New York Empire. After dropping the opening set, the Freedoms won the next three sets to take command of the match. Caroline Wozniacki and Broady won a tiebreaker in women's doubles after trading breaks with Christina McHale and María Irigoyen. Broady and Martin took the third set of mixed doubles, 5–3. Wozniacki dominated McHale in the fourth set of women's singles, 5–0, winning 20 of the 25 points played, to give the Freedoms a 17–12 lead. After the teams traded breaks in the final set of men's doubles, Guido Pella and Neal Skupski won a tiebreaker that forced extended play with the Freedoms leading 21–17. Pella and Skupski broke Lacko and Martin in the first game of extended play and held serve in the second to cut the Freedoms' lead to 21–19. However, Lacko and Martin held serve in the third game to close out a 22–19 victory.

After two road wins to start their season, the Freedoms played their home opener against the Lasers on August 2, 2016, which included an Olympic send-off party for Wozniacki. She was selected as Denmark's flag bearer for the opening ceremony. The Freedoms found themselves behind, 10–5, early in the match after the Lasers won the first two sets. Lacko and Martin held all four of their service games and converted a break point for a 5–2 set win in the third set of men's doubles. Wozniacki followed with a 5–1 set win in women's singles that gave the Freedoms a 15–13 lead. Broady and Martin took a 5–3 set win in mixed doubles to seal a 20–16 win.

The following evening, the Freedoms found themselves on the road against the five-time defending WTT champion Washington Kastles. Both teams entered the match with 3 wins and 0 losses. Lacko and Martin secured an early break to take a 3–1 lead in the opening set of men's doubles. Leander Paes and John-Patrick Smith broke back and tied the set at 3 all. But Lacko and Martin managed another break and took the set, 5–3. Broady and Martin took the second set of mixed doubles in a tiebreaker. Lacko won the men's singles set, 5–3, to give the Freedoms a 15–10 halftime lead. After dropping the women's doubles set, the Freedoms handed an 18–15 lead to Broady who faced Madison Brengle in the final set of women's singles. Broady successfully defended the only break point she faced in her four service games and converted a break against Brengle's serve to take the set, 5–3, and secure a 23–18 victory for the Freedoms. Brengle, who had only played singles this season before the start of play, entered the match having won all three of her sets by a combined score a 15–2. The win gave the Freedoms 4 wins and 0 losses and left them as the only undefeated team in WTT.

Four consecutive losses
The Freedoms returned home atop the WTT standings to face the winless Springfield Lasers, a team they had already beaten twice, on August 4, 2016. The Lasers won four of the five sets, two in tiebreakers, and went on to a 24–19 victory that handed the Freedom their first loss of the season. Two nights later, in the back end of a home-and-home series, the Lasers won three of the five sets played and defeated the Freedoms again, 23–18 in extended play.

The Freedoms' West Coast trip proved to be a struggle, as they lost to both the Orange County Breakers and the San Diego Aviators and saw their record drop to 4 wins and 4 losses.

Stretch run
On August 9, 2016, the Freedoms announced they had re-signed Coco Vandeweghe as a wildcard player.

The Freedoms took their four-match losing streak home where they met the New York Empire on August 10, 2016. The match opened with Donald Young and Fabrice Martin facing Andy Roddick and Neal Skupski. Both teams held three service games and broke once to send the set to a tiebreaker. Empire coach Patrick McEnroe substituted 2016 Wimbledon hero Marcus Willis for Skupski in the tiebreaker, but the Freedoms prevailed. After Christina McHale took the first three games of the women's singles set from Naomi Broady, the Freedoms substituted Samantha Crawford for Broady. McHale broke Crawford in her service game and took the set, 5–0, to give the Empire a 9–5 lead. The Freedoms regained the lead at 10–9, when Martin and Broady took the mixed doubles set, 5–0, from Skupski and McHale, who had substituted for María Irigoyen, after the Empire fell behind, 0–3. McHale and Irigoyen won 21 of the 32 points played against Broady and Crawford in the women's doubles set for a 5–1 victory that gave the Empire a 14–11 lead. In the final set, Young held his four service games and broke Roddick once for a 5–2 men's singles set win that tied the match at 16 all and sent it to a super tiebreaker. Young took the super tiebreaker, 7–3, to give the Freedoms a 17–16 victory and put an end to their losing streak.

The following evening, the Freedoms met the Washington Kastles at home in an atmosphere quite different from the teams' previous encounter. Just eight days earlier, the Freedoms prevailed in a matchup of WTT's only two undefeated teams. Now the Freedoms were 5–4, and the Kastles were 4–5 and facing elimination. The five-time defending WTT champions won the first three sets to gain a 15–9 lead before exacting their revenge for the home loss they suffered at the hands of the Freedoms. The 24–18 Kastles victory gave both teams 5 wins and 5 losses and put them both on the brink of elimination.

On August 12, 2016, the Freedoms hosted the Orange County Breakers, who entered the match with 8 wins and 2 losses and having already clinched a spot in the WTT Finals. Young and Martin led the Freedoms by opening the match with a 5–2 set win in men's doubles. Martin then teamed with Broady to take the third set of mixed doubles in a tiebreaker and give the Freedoms a 13–11 lead at halftime. Young closed out a 21–18 victory by taking the final set of men's singles, 5–2, over Dennis Novikov. The set was much closer than it might appear. Young successfully defended all seven break points he faced while converting one of on two break-point opportunities he had. Total points won in the set favored Young by only 21–20. Despite winning to stave off elimination, the Freedoms postseason aspirations vanished, when the San Diego Aviators defeated the Empire, 24–16, to clinch the second spot in the WTT Finals.

A win in the season's final match gave the Freedoms a record of 7 wins and 5 losses, identical to that of the Kastles. Since the teams split their two regular-season meetings, the tie for third place in the standings was broken based on games won in those head-to-head matches, which favored the Kastles, 42–41.

Rookie of the Year Award
Fabrice Martin was named 2016 WTT Male Rookie of the Year. Martin was tied for first in the league with teammate Naomi Broady in winning percentage in mixed doubles and was also fourth in men's doubles.

Event chronology
 March 25, 2016: The Freedoms selected Caroline Wozniacki, Lukáš Lacko, Daria Kasatkina, Fabrice Martin, Naomi Broady and Donald Young at the WTT Draft. The Freedoms left Taylor Townsend, Marcelo Melo, Robby Ginepri, Liezel Huber, Asia Muhammad, Abigail Spears and Coco Vandeweghe unprotected.
 July 6, 2016: The Freedoms signed Samantha Crawford.
 August 9, 2016: The Freedoms re-signed Coco Vandeweghe as a wildcard player.
 August 12, 2016: With a record of 6 wins and 5 losses, the Freedoms were eliminated from postseason contention when the San Diego Aviators defeated the New York Empire, 24–16. It is the first time they have missed the postseason since 2013.

Draft picks
With the California Dream franchise terminated by WTT, the Freedoms were the only returning conference championship loser from 2015, and selected third from the bottom (fourth) in each round of the draft. WTT conducted its 2016 Draft on March 25, in Key Biscayne, Florida. The selections made by the Freedoms are shown in the table below.

Match log
{| align="center" border="1" cellpadding="2" cellspacing="1" style="border:1px solid #aaa"
|-
! colspan="2" style="background:#0025BD; color:white" | Legend
|-
! bgcolor="ccffcc" | Freedoms Win
! bgcolor="ffbbbb" | Freedoms Loss
|-
! colspan="2" | Home team in CAPS
|}

Team personnel
References:

On-court personnel
  Josh Cohen – Head Coach
  Naomi Broady
  Samantha Crawford
  Daria Kasatkina
  Lukáš Lacko
  Fabrice Martin
  Coco Vandeweghe
  Caroline Wozniacki
  Donald Young

Front office
 Billie Jean King – Owner
 Barbara Perry – General Manager

Notes:

Statistics
Players are listed in order of their game-winning percentage provided they played in at least 40% of the Freedoms' games in that event, which is the WTT minimum for qualification for league leaders in individual statistical categories.

Men's singles

Women's singles

Men's doubles

Women's doubles

Mixed doubles

Team totals

Transactions
 March 25, 2016: The Freedoms selected Caroline Wozniacki, Lukáš Lacko, Daria Kasatkina, Fabrice Martin, Naomi Broady and Donald Young at the WTT Draft. The Freedoms left Taylor Townsend, Marcelo Melo, Robby Ginepri, Liezel Huber, Asia Muhammad, Abigail Spears and Coco Vandeweghe unprotected.
 July 6, 2016: The Freedoms signed Samantha Crawford.
 August 9, 2016: The Freedoms re-signed Coco Vandeweghe as a wildcard player.

Individual honors and achievements
Fabrice Martin was named 2016 WTT Male Rookie of the Year. Martin was tied for first in the league with teammate Naomi Broady in winning percentage in mixed doubles and was also fourth in men's doubles.

Lukáš Lacko was fifth in WTT in winning percentage in men's doubles.

See also

 Sports in Philadelphia

References

External links
Philadelphia Freedoms official website
World TeamTennis official website

Philadelphia Freedoms season
Philadelphia Freedoms 2016
Philadelphia Freedoms season